Leslie Gap (Sedlovina Leslie \se-dlo-vi-'na 'les-li\) is a 359m high ice-covered saddle extending 2.8 km in south-north direction between Leslie Hill and Radnevo Peak on Varna Peninsula in northeastern Livingston Island in the South Shetland Islands, Antarctica.  The saddle separates the glacial catchments of Kaliakra Glacier to the east and Saedinenie Snowfield to the west.  It is part of the overland route from Bowles Ridge to Vidin Heights. The south extremity of the saddle features a minor but conspicuous ice-covered knoll of elevation 404 m just north of Leslie Hill.  Leslie Gap takes its name from the adjacent Leslie Hill and was first trekked by the Bulgarian Lyubomir Ivanov from Camp Academia on 25 December 2004.

Location

Maps
 L.L. Ivanov et al. Antarctica: Livingston Island and Greenwich Island, South Shetland Islands. Scale 1:100000 topographic map. Sofia: Antarctic Place-names Commission of Bulgaria, 2005.
 L.L. Ivanov. Antarctica: Livingston Island and Greenwich, Robert, Snow and Smith Islands. Scale 1:120000 topographic map.  Troyan: Manfred Wörner Foundation, 2009.

References
 Leslie Gap. SCAR Composite Antarctic Gazetteer
 Bulgarian Antarctic Gazetteer. Antarctic Place-names Commission. (details in Bulgarian, basic data in English)
 Antarctica: Livingston Island, Climb Magazine, Issue 14, Kettering, UK, April 2006, pp. 89–91.

External links
 Leslie Gap. Copernix satellite image

Mountain passes of Livingston Island